Major A. L. Holt, MBE, MC (1896–1971) was a British military officer and explorer.

In the 1920s while a member of the Royal Engineers, Holt led a number of motorized expeditions through the deserts of Arabia, the first time such long journeys had been undertaken with such a large number of vehicles.

In 1921 Holt was involved in creating a track across the Syrian Desert from Baghdad to the eastern edge of the Basalt Desert in Jordan, which was to act as a guide track for the pilots of the Cairo – Baghdad air route. In 1923 Holt took Rose Wilder Lane, journalist B.D. MacDonald and Holt's wife by car across the same desert.

Holt traveled on occasion with St. John Philby and Gerard Leachman.

In 1923 he proposed a route for a trans-Arabian railway which he had personally surveyed in 1922 by automobile.  He writes,

The railway was never built.

References

External links
Photographs from Holt and St John Philby's 1922 expedition for the railway
Holt and travel across the desert with Rose Wilder Lane

1896 births
1971 deaths
British explorers
English explorers
Explorers of Asia
Explorers of Arabia
Members of the Order of the British Empire
Recipients of the Military Cross
Recipients of the MacGregor Medal
Royal Engineers officers